Benjamin F. Pankey (August 16, 1861 – June 1, 1929) was an American politician who served as the third lieutenant governor of New Mexico from 1919 to 1921 and as the 6th New Mexico Commissioner of Public Lands from 1927 to 1929.

References

1861 births
1929 deaths
Republican Party New Mexico state senators
Lieutenant Governors of New Mexico
New Mexico Commissioners of Public Lands